Producciones JES is a Colombian programadora. It was founded in 1964. The name was based on the founder's initials; Producciones Julio Enrique Sánchez.

History
Among the programs Producciones JES carried were cartoons, foreign programs and (most importantly) the Academy Awards, Miss Universe and Grammy Awards. JES still produces the former for RCN.

It was one of the programadoras that became part of the association OTI de Colómbia, which produced the Olympic Games and the World Cup. Other members of OTI included RCN TV, RTI Colombia, Caracol Televisión, Producciones PUNCH and Datos y Mensajes.

Suffering a fate similar to that of Promec Televisión after the licitación of 1997, its poor scheduling helped to contribute to the decline of the company. It ceased being a programadora on Thursday, September 14, 2000.

Historically important programs
Sangre de lobos
La maldición del paraíso
Espectaculares JES (1967-94)

References

JES